Clinura calliope is a species of sea snail, a marine gastropod mollusk in the family Raphitomidae.

Description
The length of the shell varies between 27 mm and 42 mm.

Distribution
Fossils of this marine species were found in Miocene strata of Tuscany, Italy; also in Lower Pliocene strata near Antibes, France, and in Pliocene strata in Málaga, Spain.

References

 Brocchi, Giambattista. Conchiologia fossile subapennina: con osservazioni geologiche sugli Apennini e sul suolo adiacente. Vol. 2. Stamp. Reale, 1814.
 Cossmann (M.), 1896 Essais de Paléoconchologie comparée (2ème livraison), p. 1-179
 Vera-Peláez, José Luis. "Revisión de la familia Turridae, excepto Clavatulinae (Gastropoda, Prosobranchia) en el Plioceno de las cuencas de Estepona, Malaga y Velez Malaga (Malaga, S Espana) con la descripcion de 26 especies nuevas." Pliocenica, Publicaciones del Museo Municipal Paleontológico de Estepona 2 (2002): 176–262.

External links
 MNHN, Paris: Surcula (Clinura) calliope
 Beets, C., 1942b. Notizen über Thatcheria Angas, Clinura Bellardi und Clinuropsis Vincent. Leidsche Geol. Meded., vol. 13, pp. 356-367

calliope
Gastropods described in 1814